Cave Spring is a census-designated place (CDP) in Adair County, Oklahoma, United States. Part of the Cherokee Nation, it was first listed as a CDP prior to the 2020 census.

The CDP is in southwestern Adair County, bordered to the southeast by Bunch and to the northeast by Lyons Switch. Bunch Road crosses the southeast side of the community, leading south  to Bunch and northeast  to Stilwell, the county seat. 

Sallisaw Creek, a south-flowing tributary of the Arkansas River, forms the boundary between Cave Spring and Bunch.

Demographics

References 

Census-designated places in Adair County, Oklahoma
Census-designated places in Oklahoma